Cultural Center San Francisco is located in the Paraiba state capital of João Pessoa.

The architectural complex of the Church of San Francisco and the Convent of St. Anthony, was built by Franciscans in 1589 and was completed in 1788. It consists of the Adro, Church, Convent and Cruis. The cultural centre is considered the largest monument in the Baroque style of Latin America. The religious site currently functions as the Sacred-School Museum of Paraíba.

Within the cultural center, a magnificent architectural complex is formed by the Church of San Francisco and the Convent of Santo Antônio. Also present are the Chapel of the Third Order of San Francisco, the Chapel of San Benito, the House of Prayer of the Third (called Chapel Dorada), Cloister of the Third Order, a fountain and a large adro with a transept, constituting one of the most remarkable legacies of the Baroque.

History

The construction was initiated by the friars of the Franciscan Order who came to Paraíba to help the Jesuits in the catechesis of the Indians. Construction began in 1589 and was completed in 1788. It became the residence of Dutch directors during the Dutch invasion; a period in which their works were interrupted.

The original project was written by Fray Francisco dos Santos and the main works were completed in 1591. The convent was damaged during the Dutch invasion. The friars were expelled in 1636. A military post was installed because of its strategic location: it dominated the entire Sanhauá valley, extending along the Paraíba river to Cabedelo.

Design 
The Church presents a style faithful to the Rococo baroque and is considered one of the most important historical-artistic religious monuments in its category. They emphasize the tower covered with tiles and the superposition of vaults, the carved sandstone, and stylized flowers are interspersed with Baroque reliefs. The walls are covered with Portuguese tiles that form panels on the history of Joseph in Egypt. The pulpit is a work of art with a rich work of gold carving, considered by UNESCO as unique throughout the world. It is speculated that he was influenced by indigenous art.

The adro, on an inclined plane, is surrounded by a wall that is covered with tiles and contains six niches with scenes of the Via Crucis. The transept is formed by a monolithic cross, with pedestal presenting figures of pelicans or the Phoenix mythological bird, "representing Christ feeding the children with their own food and the resurrection". The Adro is surrounded by two large ancient walls and tiles, with six panels representing the stations of the Passion of the Christ. The upper part of the walls is worked in stone.

Artistic and cultural importance 

The critic, photographer, and writer Mário de Andrade described the site:

French art historian Germain Bazin highlighted the Church of San Francisco as the perfect representative of the Franciscan school of architecture of the Brazilian northeast.

Elias Herckmans, a Dutch governor appointed by the West Indies Company to the Captaincy of Paraíba in 1639, briefly describes the Franciscan convent – still in the first phase of the enlargement works – as

See also
Church of Mercy
Church and Convent of Our Lady of the Rosary
Monastery of St. Benedict
Cathedral Basilica of Our Lady of the Snows
Church of Saint Peter Gonzalez

References

Baroque church buildings in Brazil
Baroque monasteries
Buildings and structures in João Pessoa, Paraíba
Convents in Brazil
Franciscan churches
Franciscan monasteries
Rococo architecture in Brazil
Roman Catholic churches in Paraíba
18th-century Roman Catholic church buildings in Brazil